Kjell Pettersen (1 March 1912 – 26 December 1967) was a Norwegian footballer. He played in one match for the Norway national football team in 1935.

References

External links
 

1912 births
1967 deaths
Norwegian footballers
Norway international footballers
Place of birth missing
Association footballers not categorized by position